John F. Kennedy High School is a public high school located in Glenmont, Maryland.

1,817 students were enrolled at Kennedy during the 2019–2020 school year. Kennedy is a member of the Downcounty Consortium along with nearby Montgomery Blair, Wheaton, Albert Einstein, and Northwood High Schools. Kennedy's feeder schools are Argyle Middle School, Eastern Middle School, A. Mario Loiederman Middle School, Newport Mill Middle School, Parkland Middle School, Sligo Middle School, Odessa Shannon Middle School, Silver Spring International Middle School, and Takoma Park Middle School. Students from any of those high schools' base areas can apply to attend Kennedy through a lottery process, after students from Kennedy's own base middle schools—Col. E. Brooke Lee and Argyle—are offered spots.
 
The school mascot is the Cavalier.

History
Opening its doors in 1964, Kennedy High School was originally going to be called East Randolph High School, but due to President John F. Kennedy's assassination in November 1963, the school was renamed after him. It initially enrolled students in 7th through 10th grades, but by the fall of 1966 changed to the now-standard 9th through 12th grade format, graduating its first full 12th grade class in the spring of 1967.

Kennedy's early history is that of an experimental, innovative school, with no school bells, broad lesson plans, innovative class subjects, pass-fail grading, an eight-period day with one free period during the day, and optional attendance in some classes. In September 1971, Bruce Sivertsen became the new principal, and Superintendent Homer O. Elseroad instructed Principal Sivertsen to increase structure, end free periods, and mandate the taking of attendance in classes. Two months later, students circulated a petition to allow students to be present in the building when not in class, open unused classrooms for student use, allow student input in the curriculum, biweekly assemblies with the principal to discuss problems, and hiring of teachers by departments. Students said that the principal's changes had changed the nature of the school, from open and friendly to tense. In April 1972, the Montgomery County school board voted to adopt a policy that allows innovative methods and programs only with the support of parents and teachers. The policy did not require a formal survey of parents' and teachers' opinions though.

In 1984, about 100 students and parents met with Principal Robert Hacker to complain about an ongoing pattern of racial discrimination at Kennedy. They said that certain staff members would disproportionately discipline black students compared to white students. They criticized racist caricatures of black individuals printed in the school's newspaper. During a basketball game between Kennedy and Northwood High School, Hecker requested police presence due to rumors of fights. When the police chased students with dogs, threw students against walls, and frisked students, Principal Hacker did not object at the time and said the police department was responsible.

In 1985, Northwood High School in Kemp Mill was closed due to declining enrollment, and its students were transferred to Kennedy. When Kennedy's building was renovated between 1997 and 1999, its students attended classes in Northwood's building during those years. In 2004, Northwood reopened to students after student enrollment increased again.

Demographics
Of Kennedy's student body for the 2019–2020 school year, 25% was African American, 7% was Asian American, 61% was Hispanic, 5% was Non-Hispanic White, less than 5% was Native American, and less than 5% was of two or more races.

Academics
Kennedy offers the International Baccalaureate diploma, which about 13% of students take. There are also five academy programs designed to attract students from across the Downcounty Consortium: the Leadership Training Institute (LTI), broadcast journalism, business management, health professions, and Navy Junior ROTC. Kennedy additionally offers over 15 Advanced Placement courses for students to earn college credit—ranging from Studio Art to World History -- which 69% of students take. During the 2019–2020 school year, 28% of its graduating class scored a 3 or better on an Advanced Placement test or 4 or better on an Baccalaureate test. On the SAT, the school average is 897. Around 89% of its graduating class enroll in two- and four-year colleges and universities. Like all other Montgomery County high schools, at least 75 hours of community service are required for graduation.

In 2020, Newsweek ranked Kennedy the 112th-best school in Maryland.

Athletics

Ken Cudd is the recently retired athletic director. He retired after working many years as an English and LTI teacher. Amanda Twele is the new athletic director.

All tournaments and finals are conducted by the Maryland Public Secondary Schools Athletic Association (MPSSAA).

Championships

Basketball
 Boys Division Championships: 1989, 1997, 2004
 Boys Regional Championships: 1989, 1996, 2004
 Girls Division Championship: 2006

Cheerleading
 State Championships: 1999, 2000, 2007

Cross Country
 Boys State Championship: 1974 (Class A; 64; Coach Al Bellman)
 Girls State Championship: 1983 (Class A; 67; Coach Al Bellman) 
 Girls Division Championships: 1983, 1984, 1987, 1988
 Girls Regional Championships: 1983, 1984
 Girls County Championships: 1999; 2000
 Girls County Division Championships: 1999, 2000, 2002, 2008

Field Hockey
 State Championship: 1981 (5–0; Coach Barbara Belt) 
 State Semifinalist: 1980, 1982

Football
 State Championships: 1977 (Class C; 13–0; Coach Wesley Abrams), 1984 (Class A; 18–15; Coach Brady Straub)
 Division Championships: 1984, 1990
 Regional Championship: 1984

Indoor Track
 Boys Regional Championship: 1979
 Boys County Championship: 1986
 Girls Regional Championships: 1985, 1986, 1987, 1988, 1989
 Girls County Championships: 1986, 1989

Soccer 
 Boys State Championships: 1978 (Class B vs. Oakland Mills; Coach Gene Hostetler), 1989 (Class 3A; tied 2–2 vs. Howard {then #1 ranked team by USA Today}; Coach Jeff Schultz)
 Boys State Finalist: 1980, 1985
 Boys Regional Championships: 1979, 1980, 1985, 1987 
 Boys Division Championship: 2010
 Girls Division Championships: 1997, 2009

Swim and Dive
 Boys Division Championships: 2005, 2007
 Girls Division Championships: 2007

Tennis
 Boys Division Champions: 1980, 1988, 1989, 1999, 2000, 2005, 2017
 Girls Division Championships: 1993, 2002

Track and Field
 Girls Division Championships: 1983, 1984, 1986, 1987, 1988, 1989
 Boys Division Championships: 1984, 1988, 1989, 1993, 2002
 Boys Finalist: 1967

Wrestling
 1988 Montgomery County Individual Champion Shawn Dykes (189 lbs)

Athletic rivalries
Kennedy's primary rival is Wheaton High School, due to the schools' close proximity to one another.

Other smaller rivalries include those with Albert Einstein High School and for lacrosse Rockville High School.

Facilities
Kennedy's Football stadium is named in memory of Brady Straub, who coached the 1984 football team to the state championship.  The following year, he bravely led the team while battling cancer, succumbing shortly after the end of the season. The field was redone in the spring of 2007 after being condemned by the county for poor conditions.

The gymnasium hallway bears the last name of former Kennedy all-star basketball player and captain Jeremy Herring. Herring, who was the lead scorer for Montgomery County in 2007, was slain along with his brother Justin Herring (also an alumni) in the summer following his graduation.

Notable alumni

 Charles Arndt, American Professional Soccer League goalkeeper for the Maryland Bays
 Rachel Chavkin, Broadway director
 Burrell Ellis, member of the Board of Commissioners of DeKalb County, Georgia; former chief executive officer of DeKalb County
 Vencie Glenn, National Football League defensive back
 Humayun Khan, American soldier 
 Allison Krause, a student at Kent State University, killed by the Ohio Army National Guard at a campus protest; a tree was planted at Kennedy in her memory
 Thea LaFond, Olympic triple jumper
 Erik McMillan, All-Pro NFL defensive back
 Robert Mugge, American documentary filmmaker
 Curtis Pride, Major League Baseball outfielder, head baseball coach at Gallaudet University
 Lori Stokes, television broadcast journalist

Notable faculty
 Thea LaFond, Olympic triple jumper

See also

 List of memorials to John F. Kennedy

References

External links

 
 

Glenmont, Maryland
Public high schools in Montgomery County, Maryland
Educational institutions established in 1964
1964 establishments in Maryland
Monuments and memorials to John F. Kennedy in the United States